Paper is an educational technology company that partners with schools and school districts to provide students with free, unlimited, 24/7 tutoring. The platform has more than two million users across the United States. The company is headquartered in Montreal, Quebec and has operations across North America.

History 
Originally named GradeSlam, Paper was founded in 2014 by McGill University graduates Philip Cutler and Roberto Cipriani. Cutler, a former teacher and tutor, recognized that many of his students were seeking additional support through tutors or homework help programs. These services were reserved for the wealthiest of families, with hardly any options available for the general student population. He felt that education should be focused on access and equality, so he left teaching to start the company with a mission to deliver true educational equity and level the playing field for all students.

Seed Financing 

In August 2016, the company announced that it raised $1.6 million from venture capitalists in August 2016. The financing was led by Birchmere Ventures, with participation from BDC Capital. Over the following years, their product offering evolved beyond tutoring to include a comprehensive suite of tools to support both students and teachers.

Series A 

The company officially announced a rebrand from GradeSlam to Paper in March 2020. At the same time they announced a $7.5 million dollar financing that was backed by investors including Reach Capital, Bullpen Capital, Birchmere Ventures, Google and others.  Paper is credited with the creation of the Educational Support System category.

The conversational nature of Paper's platform is designed for ease of use to ensure the widest net of accessibility for students. Google's AI Assistant fund led an investment into the company.

Series B 

Less than one year after completing its Series A financing, Paper announced it had closed an $11 million dollar Series B led by Toronto based venture capital fund Framework Venture Partners. At the time of the financing, Paper reported having 50 public school customers and 75 employees.

The round, announced in December 2020, followed a year of rapid growth for Paper and the broader education technology industry.

Series C 

In June 2021, Paper announced a $100 million dollar financing led by venture capital fund  IVP. At the time, the financing was one of the largest ever for a Canadian education company.

Series D 

The company announced a Series D financing of $270 million dollars in February 2022. The financing was co-led by Softbank, and Sapphire Ventures. It also included earlier investors IVP, Salesforce Ventures, Framework Venture Partners, Bullpen Capital, Reach Capital, BDC Capital, and Red House Education. At the time, the company disclosed that it was supporting "close to 2 million students". The financing became the company's 3rd publicly announced funding in a span of 13 months.

Software and product

Live Help 
Paper provides a comprehensive Educational Support System (ESS). The ESS consists of a number of student, teacher and administrator tools. They are best known for the online tutoring that provides 24/7 live help and essay review.
For students, Paper provides schools with the ability to offer students with chat-based access to tutors. Tutors working for Paper are regarded as an extension of each school’s individual teaching staff. Teachers are granted access to see their student's tutoring interactions. Teachers also receive insights to help inform their teaching and have a pulse on their class' assessments.

Writing Feedback 
In response to requests for writing specific feedback, Paper launched a service called Essay Review. Essay review allows any written work to be annotated and reviewed by a writing specific tutor who helps the student advance their written skills. 

Initially intended for language arts classes, Essay Review began being used by students in all classes, as well as for resumes and other personal writing pieces. In 2020, Paper introduced the “plagiar-eyes” badge. The badge appears on reviewed essays. It lets students and teachers know that there is work required to remove any instances of plagiarism.

PaperLive 
In July 2022, Paper announced their own television network, PaperLive. PaperLive provides students with interactive, live after-school programming free to students with Paper licences. 

The hosts of shows on PaperLive are educational experts in a variety of subjects that weaving together captivating storytelling with important concepts covered in K-12 learning. On September 12, 2022, less than two months after announcing the network, it officially launched to users as part of their back-to-school campaign.

Education Content 

In March 2020, Paper launched an education industry focused blog. The Paper blog includes educator spotlights, industry interviews, and series about coping with school closures during the COVID-19 pandemic.

The company has released a series of White Papers and guides for the education and edtech industry. These documents highlight research and analysis across a spectrum of issues and ideas in education.

Educational impact 
Paper has conducted a number of efficacy studies to identify the educational impact of their ESS. A study conducted with 5th grade students saw students using Paper experience 30% more growth in English language development than peers without access to the ESS.

During the extended school closures caused by COVID-19, Paper was heavily depended upon by schools looking to provide remote teaching and learning for students. The company reported record months of student engagement in March 2020 and April 2020 as a result of distance learning initiatives. The company is reported to have large penetration in major US markets including the Bay Area where over a dozen school districts have implemented the service.

In June 2021, the company reported supporting over 1 million students and employing 1000 tutors and 130 staff.

By January 2022, Paper reported supporting 2 million students and teachers on the platform. School districts partnering with Paper included many of the largest in the US including Hillsborough County Public Schools, Clark County School District, School District of Palm Beach County, Boston Public Schools, Columbus City Schools, Atlanta Public Schools and Santa Ana Unified School District.

Media reception 
Paper has been featured on Bloomberg News, CNBC  Cheddar, NBC News, The National (CBC) for its role in the education and technology markets.

In September 2015, the company was selected by Tourism Montreal as one of the Top 10 Startups In Montreal.
In July 2017, GradeSlam was selected by MindShare Learning as one of the Top Ten News Stories Of The Summer 

Paper is the winner of many awards including the 2020 EdTech Award for Best Tutoring Solution. 

The company has been labelled one of the fastest-growing companies in North America. It was listed as the 21st fastest-growing company in Canada in 2020.

Paper was selected to the GSV EdTech 150 in 2021 and 2022. The GSV EdTech 150 recognizes the 150 "most transformational growth companies in digital learning". The list highlights companies that are selected based on their impact finding innovative and scalable ways to serve learners around the world.

References

Distance education in Canada
Education companies of Canada
Online companies of Canada
Companies based in Montreal
2014 establishments in Quebec